Barry F. Lowenkron (born 1952) is an American specialist in foreign relations. He was Vice President of the Program on Global Security & Sustainability at the MacArthur Foundation from 2007 to 2014.

Life
Lowenkron is a graduate of the Maimonides School and of Northeastern University (1973). He holds an  M.A. (1977) from the Nitze School of Advanced International studies at  the Johns Hopkins University.   
From 2005 to 2007 Lowenkron was Assistant Secretary of State for the Bureau of Democracy, Human Rights and Labor.

From 1979 until 2005, Lowenkron was Adjunct Lecturer in American Foreign Policy at the Nitze School of Advanced International Studies of the Johns Hopkins University, where he taught courses on American Foreign Policy. He has been a Ford Foundation Fellow on Arms Control and Eastern Europe and a Hubert H. Humphrey Fellow. Mr. Lowenkron is a member of the Council on Foreign Relations.

Al Kamen of The Washington Post'' calls Lowenkron a "longtime foreign policy guru...who has worked at the Pentagon, the CIA and the State Department's policy planning shop."

Honors
 Ford Foundation Fellow on Arms Control and Eastern Europe 
 Hubert H. Humphrey Fellow

References

1952 births
Living people
Maimonides School alumni
Northeastern University alumni
Paul H. Nitze School of Advanced International Studies alumni
Johns Hopkins University faculty
Ford Foundation fellowships
United States Assistant Secretaries of State